This is a listing of the horses that finished in either first, second, or third place and the number of starters in the Breeders' Cup Turf Sprint, run on grass as part of the Breeders' Cup World Thoroughbred Championships. The Turf Sprint was introduced in 2007 and became a Grade I race in 2009.

Source: Equibase Charts

References

External links
 Breeders' Cup official website

Lists of horse racing results
Turf Sprint